Ryrie  is a surname. Notable people with the surname include:

 Alec Ryrie (born 1971), British historian of Protestant Christianity
 Alexander Ryrie (1827–1909), Australian politician
 Charles Caldwell Ryrie (1925–2016), American Christian writer and theologian 
 Christobelle Grierson-Ryrie (born 1992), New Zealand fashion model 
 David Ryrie (1829–1893), Australian politician
 Granville Ryrie, (1865–1937), Australian soldier and politician 
 John Ryrie (1886–1927), Australian rower
 Phineas Ryrie (1829–1892), tea merchant

See also
 Ryrie Rock, geographical formation in Antarctica